Pseudolotus is a monotypic genus of flowering plants belonging to the family Fabaceae. The only species is Pseudolotus villosus.

Its native range is Arabian Peninsula, Iran to Pakistan.

References

Loteae
Monotypic Fabaceae genera